List of paintings on postage stamps of former Soviet Union by title (incomplete as unattributed paintings are not included).

See also 
 List of notable postage stamps
 Stamps of the Soviet Union

References

StampRussia.com
Philateli.ucoz.ru

Postage stamps of the Soviet Union
Postage
paintings_on_Soviet_postage_stamps